Stenauxa fasciata is a species of beetle in the family Cerambycidae. It was described by Stephan von Breuning and Pierre Téocchi in 1983.

References

Parmenini
Beetles described in 1983